Harnaut Assembly constituency is one of 243 constituencies of legislative assembly of Bihar. It is a part of Nalanda Lok Sabha constituency along with other assembly constituencies viz. Rajgir, Nalanda, Islampur, Hilsa, Asthawan and Biharsharif.

Bihar's Chief Minister Nitish Kumar has contested from this seat four times. He lost in 1977 as member of Janata Party, lost again in 1980 as member of Charan Singh's Janata Party (Secular) which changed its name later to Lok Dal, won in 1985 as member of Lok Dal, did not contest in 1990, and won in 1995 as member of Samata Party. He has never contested assembly election since, and has been elected to the upper house as MLC in 2006, 2012, and 2018. He has been elected to Lok Sabha 6 times.

Overview
Harnaut comprises CD Blocks Harnaut, Chandi & Nagar Nausa.

Members of Legislative Assembly

2020

2015

2010

References

External links
 

Politics of Nalanda district
Assembly constituencies of Bihar